Bardwell Road is a road in North Oxford, England, off the Banbury Road.

The road is the location of the Dragon School, a well-known preparatory school. The second headmaster, Charles Cotterill Lynam (known as the "Skipper"), took a building lease on land to the southeast of Bardwell Road in 1893. In 1894, Lynam's Oxford Preparatory School was established on this site. £4,000 was quickly raised through subscriptions from local parents for the erection of new school buildings. The school moved from its previous location at 17 Crick Road within a year. The choice of its new location proved to be a wise one and the school has prospered as the Dragon School on this site to the present day.

The Bardwell Road Centre, one of the two locations of St Clare's International School, is to be found here as well.

Wychwood School for girls is located on the southern corner of Bardwell Road and Banbury Road, at the western end.

Also off the road is the Cherwell Boathouse, down a lane at the junction with Chadlington Road next to the Dragon School playing fields, where punts can be rented for use on the River Cherwell.

Northmoor Road, Charlbury Road lead off Bardwell Road and Chadlington Road is at the far end from the Banbury Road, leading to Linton Road.

Houses on Bardwell Road were largely built during the 1890s. Architects included Harry Wilkinson Moore, Herbert Quinton, and Messrs Radclyffe and Watson.

References

Streets in Oxford
Dragon School